Pedro Botelho may refer to:

Pedro Henrique Botelho (born 1987), Brazilian football defender
Pedro Roberto Silva Botelho (born 1989), Brazilian football defender